Adolphe Martignoni (28 July 1909 – 7 February 1989) was a Swiss ice hockey player who competed for the Swiss national team at the 1936 Winter Olympics in Garmisch-Partenkirchen.

References

External links

1909 births
1989 deaths
Ice hockey players at the 1936 Winter Olympics
Olympic ice hockey players of Switzerland
Swiss ice hockey defencemen